Charles Louis Constant Pauquy (27 September 1800 – 11 February 1854) was a French botanist.

1800 births
1854 deaths
19th-century French botanists
People from Amiens